Sophie Hæstorp Andersen (born 26 September 1974) is a Danish politician. She is the Lord Mayor of Copenhagen Municipality as of 1 January 2022. She was the regional council chairperson of the Capital Region from 1 January 2014 until 31 July 2021. Before that, she sat in the Folketing.

Andersen is the daughter of Svend Hæstorp and costume designer Pia Else Andersen. She is married to Troels Andersen and they have two children, Rosa and Rolf.

In 2020 she was chosen by the Social Democrats to be their main candidate for mayor of Copenhagen in 2021, replacing Frank Jensen.

References

1974 births
Living people
Social Democrats (Denmark) politicians
Politicians from Copenhagen
Women members of the Folketing
Members of the Folketing 2001–2005
Members of the Folketing 2005–2007
Members of the Folketing 2007–2011
Members of the Folketing 2011–2015
21st-century Danish women politicians
20th-century Danish women